A town sign or city limit sign is a road sign placed at the side of the road or street at the boundary of the territory of a city, town, or village. Town signs may be placed for reading both by drivers entering the town and, in a different format, by those exiting it. Signs give the name of the town in the local official languages, and sometimes in other languages. In some countries, town signs are also an essential part of the traffic law, for example by defining (explicitly or implicitly) the speed limit within the town's territory.

In the UK town sign may refer to a prominent, decorative, often carved sign, commemorating the values and history of the town. Synonymous with Village sign; Commonly in the centre of the town.

In much of the United States, there is a similar county sign at the boundary between each county (or independent city not part of one), indicating the county being entered and often the one being left. Even if not done within a given U.S. state, there is also nearly always a welcome sign at the state line on every major highway, and most any other road. The welcome signs on Interstate highways are usually very large and have graphics, and may have an attached text-only sign directing motorists to the welcome center at a rest area. On smaller roads, they are usually more similar to town signs, showing the state and county, often with other signs indicating speed limit, a state law (such as "burn headlights during rain"), and/or a change in time zone.

Gallery 

Street furniture
Traffic signs
Signage
Road safety